The South African Cricket Board of Control (SACBOC) was a sports governing body that existed in South Africa under apartheid.  It governed cricket games played by non-white players.

References

Cricket administration in South Africa
Crick
Cricket and apartheid